The 2020–21 Women's FA Cup was the 51st staging of the Women's FA Cup, a knockout cup competition for women's football teams in England. Manchester City were the defending champions, having beaten Everton 3–1 in the previous final. The draw was split regionally until the fourth round proper.

Teams 
A total of 376 teams had their entries to the tournament accepted by The Football Association, an increase of 76 from the previous year. 174 teams from outside the top four divisions will enter at the extra preliminary round with another 109 joining in the preliminary round. The 47 teams that play in the FA Women's National League Division One (tier 4) are given exemption to the second round qualifying, while teams in the Northern and Southern Premier Divisions (tier 3) enter at the second round proper. Teams in the FA Women's Super League and FA Women's Championship (tiers 1 and 2) are exempted to the fourth round proper.

Extra preliminary round

As a result of 376 teams entering the competition, 174 teams were drawn into an extra preliminary round, which were played on Sunday 6 September 2020.

Preliminary round
98 matches were scheduled for the preliminary round on Sunday 20 September 2020, made up of the 87 winning teams from the extra preliminary round plus the 109 teams that were granted a bye into the preliminary round.

First round qualifying
49 matches were scheduled for the first round qualifying on Sunday 4 October 2020, made up of the 98 winning teams from the preliminary round and did not include the introduction of any new teams.

Second round qualifying
48 matches were scheduled for the second round qualifying on Sunday 18 October 2020, made up of the 49 winning teams from the first round qualifying and included the introduction of 47 teams from the fourth-tier FA Women's National League Division One.

Third round qualifying
24 matches were scheduled for the third round qualifying on Sunday 1 November 2020, made up of the 48 winning teams from the second round qualifying and did not include the introduction of any new teams.

First round proper
Twelve matches were scheduled for the first round proper, pending a fixture date due to restrictions caused by the COVID-19 pandemic. The round was eventually scheduled for Sunday 13 December 2020. The round was made up of the 24 winners from the previous round and did not include the introduction of any new teams.

Second round proper
18 matches were scheduled for the second round proper originally scheduled for Sunday 3 January 2021. The round was made up of the 12 winners from the previous round and included the introduction of 24 teams from the third-tier FA Women's National League Premier Division. With only one game able to go ahead, the competition was suspended on 4 January 2021 following further government restrictions on non-elite sport due to the ongoing COVID-19 pandemic. The competition recommenced on 31 March, with the second round matches being held on 4 April.

Third round proper
Nine matches were played on Sunday 11 April 2021. The round was made up of the 18 winners from the previous round and did not include the introduction of any new teams.

Fourth round proper
16 matches were played on the weekend of 18 April 2021. The round was made up of the nine winners from the previous round and introduced 23 teams from the first and second-tier FA Women's Super League and FA Women's Championship.

Fifth round proper
Eight matches were scheduled for the fifth round proper and played Sunday 16 May 2021 with the exception of Chelsea who were competing in the 2021 UEFA Women's Champions League Final on that day and as such had their FA Cup game against Everton rescheduled to Thursday 20 May 2021. The round was made up of the 16 winners from the previous round.

Quarter-finals
Following a three-month hiatus to the competition during the second round proper from 4 January to 4 April 2021 due to government guidelines, the final stages of 2020–21 Women's FA Cup were delayed until the 2021–22 season. The competition recommenced at the quarter-final stage on Wednesday 29 September 2021. As a result of playing the competition across two seasons, clubs were able to register new players barring certain restrictions: any player who had not yet featured in the 2020–21 Women's FA Cup could be registered. Up to three players who appeared in the competition for teams that had been eliminated prior to the quarter-final stage could be registered for their new club but no player who appeared for a different team still in the quarter-finals could be registered.

Semi-finals
The semi-finals were played on Sunday 31 October 2021 and both televised by the BBC.

Final

The final was played at Wembley Stadium on Sunday 5 December 2021.

Television rights

References

Women's FA Cup seasons
Cup
Women's FA Cup, 2020-21
Women's FA Cup